The Soultzbach  (also Ruisseau le Soulzbach) is a river in Alsace, France.

References

External links 
 Localisation des points de prélèvements (pdf; 994 kB)

Rivers of France
Rivers of Grand Est
Rivers of Bas-Rhin
Tributaries of the Sauer (Rhine)